The following is a chronological list of classical music composers who live in, work in, or are citizens of Russia, or who have done so.

Renaissance
 Ivan IV Vasilyevich (Ivan the Terrible) (1530–1584)

Baroque
 Nikolay Diletsky (c. 1630 – after 1680)
 Symeon Pekalytsky (born c. 1630)
 Vasily Polikarpovich Titov (c. 1650 – c. 1715)
 Ivan Domaratsky (second half of the 17th century — first half of the 18th century)

Classical era

Romantic

Modern/contemporary

Russian